The Churihar are a Muslim community, found in North India.

Origin

The word Churihar is derived from the Hindi words chura hara, literally a manufacturer of bangles. They were traditionally associated with the manufacture of bangles, and have no origin myth. It is likely, that they are amalgam of different groups who took to manufacturing bangles, and are now bound by rules of endogamy. The community may be related to the Manihar, another community of bangle manufacturers. They are Sunni Muslims, and speak Urdu, as well of local dialects of Hindi, such as Khari Boli. The Churihar are further divided into clans, known as biradaris. Traditionally, marriages take place within the biradari.

Present Circumstances  

The Churihar in Bihar are found mainly in the districts of Bhagalpur, Dumka, Gaya, Munger and Patna. They speak the Angika dialect of Hindi. In Uttar Pradesh, they are found in the districts of Agra, Mathura, Allahabad, Lalitpur and Jhansi.  Churihar are Shaikh status. Like other Muslim artisan castes, the community no longer practice their traditional occupations. The Churihar are now mainly farmers, and Uttar Pradesh, many are also hide merchants. They live in multi-caste villages, but occupy their own quarters. Each settlement contains an informal caste council, known as panchayats, which act as instrument of social control.

References

Social groups of Bihar
Social groups of Uttar Pradesh
Muslim communities of Uttar Pradesh
Indian castes
Muslim communities of India
Muslim communities of Bihar